Gilbert Greenall, 1st Baron Daresbury,  (30 March 1867 – 24 October 1938), known as Sir Gilbert Greenall, 2nd Baronet, from 1894 to 1927, was a British brewer, business man, landowner, peer, and master of foxhounds.

Greenall was the son of Sir Gilbert Greenall, 1st Baronet. The family's wealth was based on the brewing business established by Greenall's great-grandfather Thomas Greenall in 1762 (which later became the Greenall's Group). His father also had large interests in canals and banking. Greenall succeeded his father in the baronetcy in 1894.

In the late 1890s, Greenall sought the position of Master of the Cheshire Foxhounds, but was turned down, as he was deemed to be "not quite a gentleman". However, he was taken on as Master by the Belvoir Hunt and served for sixteen years.

Greenall served as High Sheriff of Cheshire for the year 1907 and was appointed as a deputy lieutenant the same year. In 1927 he was raised to the peerage as Baron Daresbury, of Walton in the County of Chester.

Lord Daresbury married Frances Eliza, daughter of Captain Edward Wynne Griffith, in 1900. He died in October 1938, aged 71, and was succeeded in his titles by his son Edward. Lady Daresbury died in 1953.

Arms

References

Sources
 Kidd, Charles, Williamson, David (editors). Debrett's Peerage and Baronetage (1990 edition). New York: St Martin's Press, 1990.
 

1867 births
1938 deaths
Barons in the Peerage of the United Kingdom
Deputy Lieutenants of Cheshire
High Sheriffs of Cheshire
Commanders of the Royal Victorian Order
Gilbert
Masters of foxhounds in England
Barons created by George V
English justices of the peace